Glen Stuart Sharpley (born September 6, 1956) is a Canadian former professional ice hockey player who played 286 games in the National Hockey League with the Minnesota North Stars and Chicago Black Hawks. He now lives in Huntsville, Ontario, where he is the owner of Sharpley Source for Sports.

International play

Career statistics

Regular season and playoffs

International

External links 

1956 births
Living people
Canadian ice hockey centres
Chicago Blackhawks players
Cleveland Crusaders draft picks
Ice hockey people from Toronto
Minnesota North Stars draft picks
Minnesota North Stars players
National Hockey League first-round draft picks
People from York, Toronto